Minuscule 233 (in the Gregory-Aland numbering), ε 173 (Soden), is a Greek minuscule manuscript of the New Testament, on parchment and paper. Paleographically it has been assigned to the 13th century.

Description 

The codex contains the text of the four Gospels, on 279 parchment leaves (size ), with some lacunae. It is written partly on parchment, partly on paper, in two columns per page, 37 lines per page. The leaves are arranged in octavo. It has some additional material (life of saints).

It has ligatures. The paper has survived in bad condition. It is hard to read.

Text 

Kurt Aland the Greek text of the codex did not place in any Category.
It was not examined by the Claremont Profile Method.

History 

The manuscript once belonged to Matthew Dandolo, a Venetian noble.

It was described by Daniel Gotthilf Moldenhawer, who collated it about 1783 for Andreas Birch (Esc. 12).

It is currently housed at the Escurial (Cod. Escurialensis, Y. II. 8).

See also 

 List of New Testament minuscules
 Biblical manuscript
 Textual criticism

References

Further reading 

 Emmanuel Miller, Catalogue des manuscrits grecs de la bibliothèque de l'Escurial (Paris 1848), p. 274-275.
 

Greek New Testament minuscules
13th-century biblical manuscripts